Charyshskoye is a rural locality (a selo) and the administrative center of Charyshsky Selsoviet, Ust-Kalmansky District, Altai Krai, Russia. The population was 1,243 as of 2013. There are 10 streets.

Geography 
Charyshskoye is located 7 km north of Ust-Kalmanka (the district's administrative centre) by road. Ust-Kalmanka is the nearest rural locality.

References 

Rural localities in Ust-Kalmansky District